Szczecin pasztecik, or simply pasztecik, is a Polish variety of machine-produced deep-fried yeast dough stuffed with a meat or vegetarian filling, served in specialised bars as a fast food. It is a typical dish of Szczecin, where it was popular during the time of the Polish People's Republic and still retains this popularity, having become a cultural food of the region. 

The filling consists of either: minced beef (the oldest and the most popular), or sauerkraut and dried mushrooms, or cheese and champignons. During the time of the PPR, when a lack of meat on the market was a frequent occurrence, it was common to replace the meat stuffing with egg paste. The dough is crispy on the outside and soft inside. 

The minced beef filling resembles pâté, the Polish word "pasztecik" is a diminutive of the word "pasztet" (pâté). Usually served with clear, spicy red barszcz. It should not be frozen or warmed again.

History 
The first bar serving "pasztecik szczeciński", Bar "Pasztecik" (still functioning) was founded in 1969, using machines imported from the Soviet Union army stationing in Szczecin, which could quickly produce large amounts of food for the Soviet soldiers. The machine, weighing over one tonne, is able to produce over 600 "paszteciki" in an hour. From 22 December 2010, "pasztecik szczeciński" is listed on the official Polish traditional products list and hence protected by European Union law, which means that all producers have to strictly follow the traditional recipe. Pasztecik Szczeciński is currently served also in other cities in Poland, as well as Wiesbaden in Germany.

From 2015 onwards, 20th of October is celebrated as the Day of the pasztecik szczeciński.

See also 
 Paprykarz szczeciński
 Bar mleczny
 List of Polish dishes
 Zapiekanka

Notes

References

Further reading
 Article about "pasztecik szczeciński" in Internetowa Encyklopedia Szczecina
 Description on the Lista produktów tradycyjnych (state List of traditional products)

Polish cuisine
Deep fried foods
Savoury pies
Fast food
Snack foods
Szczecin
Stuffed dishes